The murder of Stephanie Roper involved a Frostburg State University student.  On April 3, 1982, Stephanie Roper, a 22-year-old, was kidnapped, brutally raped repeatedly, tortured, shot, set afire, and partially dismembered.

Murder
Roper was home on a college break, and she and a girlfriend were returning from an evening with friends at a West End Washington, D.C. bar, the "Twenty-First Amendment" late at night. After dropping her friend off in Brandywine, Maryland, Stephanie proceeded toward her own home in Croom, but her car became disabled on a dark rural road.  Two men stopped and instead of helping, kidnapped her at gunpoint. The two men, Jack Ronald Jones and Jerry Lee Beatty, kidnapped Stephanie and took her to an abandoned shack in Oakville, St. Mary's County. There she was tortured and raped repeatedly. One of the men called the other by his first name. Afraid now that Stephanie knew his name, they decided to kill her. Stephanie made several attempts to escape and upon her last capture, her skull was fractured with a logging chain and she was shot to death.  In order to hinder identification, the murderers burned her body and severed her hands. They were captured after the younger man bragged about his part in the crime. Both men were charged with kidnapping, rape, and felony murder.  The primary killer was convicted in Baltimore County while his co-defendant pleaded guilty to the same charges in Anne Arundel County. Both courts imposed sentences of two concurrent life sentences, with parole eligibility after 24 years.

Family response
The Roper family was excluded from observing the trial and was denied the opportunity to present a victim impact statement at sentencing.  Stephanie's mother, Roberta Roper, has taken on the cause of victims' rights, including the right of victims' families to address the court before sentencing. She actively lobbies and advocates for rights and support services to crime victims and their survivors. She and her husband, Vincent, formed the Stephanie Roper Committee and Foundation, Inc. and she served as its Executive Director for 20 years. The agency is now known as the Maryland Crime Victims' Resource Center, Inc. (MCVRC). Roberta Roper has dedicated her life to these causes. She serves as the Chair of the MCVRC Board of Directors and co-chairs the National Victims' Constitutional Amendment Network.

Crime Victims' Rights Act
The Crime Victims' Rights Act of 2004 was named, in part, for Stephanie Roper, whose parents were not notified of trial continuances, were excluded from proceedings, and were prevented from giving a victim impact statement. The Act grants victims those and other rights in federal criminal cases.

Legacy

Maryland's annual Crime Victims and Advocates Commemorative Day
In 2012, the Maryland General Assembly passed House Bill 766 (Chapter 678 of the Laws of Maryland 2012) which requires the Governor annually to proclaim April 3 as Crime Victims and Advocates Commemorative Day to give recognition to the individuals in the State who have become crime victims and to honor the advocates who serve those victims. In addition to issuing the proclamation, the Governor is also required to take appropriate steps to publicize Crime Victims and Advocates Commemorative Day. April 3 was chosen as the date for the commemorative day in memory of Stephanie Roper, who was murdered on that day in 1982 and whose family members established the Maryland Crime Victims' Resource Center, Inc.

Stephanie Roper Highway
On October 20, 2012, Maryland Governor Martin O'Malley issued a proclamation which named part of Maryland Route 4 (the part of Pennsylvania Avenue just north of Croom, and part of Southern Maryland Boulevard in adjacent Anne Arundel County) in honor of Stephanie Roper and the efforts of her parents Roberta and Vincent Roper.

The Stephanie Roper Gallery at Frostburg State University
The Stephanie Ann Roper Gallery is located in the Fine Arts Building on the Frostburg State University campus.

Roper Victim Assistance Academy
The Roper Victim Assistance Academy trains victims' advocates.  The Roper Academy was created in 2003 through a grant from the United States Department of Justice, Office for Victims of Crime received by the Maryland Governor's Office of Crime Control and Prevention in partnership with the University of Baltimore.

References

External links
Maryland Crime Victims' Resource Center, Inc.
Mlis.state.md.us
Mlis.state.md.us
Roper Victim Assistance Academy

People murdered in Maryland
Deaths by firearm in Maryland
American murder victims
American torture victims
Murdered American students
Rapes in the United States
1982 in Maryland
1982 murders in the United States
Incidents of violence against women
April 1982 events in the United States
Female murder victims
History of women in Maryland